"God's Mistake" is a song by the British band Tears for Fears, featured on their 1995 album Raoul and the Kings of Spain. The song was the first single taken from the album in the United States and Canada (where it was a minor hit), but the second to be taken from the album in the UK (following the release of the title track).

It reached #61 in the UK, #102 in the US and #48 in Canada.

Track listing

USCD5/34K 663418-2

 "God's Mistake" - 3:47
 "Until I Drown" - (Roland Orzabal, Alan Griffiths)-3:23
 "War of Attrition" - (Roland Orzabal, Alan Griffiths)- 3:41

USCD5/34K 78064-2C 

 "God's Mistake" - 3:47
 "Creep" (Live in Birmingham) - 4:55

Austrian CD EPC 663117 2 

 "God's Mistake" - 3:47
 "Raoul and the Kings of Spain" (Acoustic Radio Performance) -(Roland Orzabal, Alan Griffiths)- 4:26
 "Break It Down Again" (Acoustic Radio Performance) -(Roland Orzabal, Alan Griffiths)- 3:11

1995 singles
Tears for Fears songs
Songs written by Roland Orzabal
1995 songs